Safiabad (also Romanized as Şafīābād) is a village in Qareh Chay Rural District, in the Central District of Saveh County, Markazi Province, Iran. At the 2006 census, its population was 16, in 5 families.

References 

Populated places in Saveh County